Thomas Dent may refer to:

 Thomas Dynt or Dent (fl. 1414), English politician
 Thomas Dent Sr. (1630–1676), Maryland politician
 Thomas Dent (lawyer) (1831–1924), Chicago lawyer
 Thomas Dent (Ontario politician) (1891–1977), politician in Ontario, Canada
 Thomas Dent (writer) (1932–1998), African-American poet and writer
 Tom Dent (born 1950), American politician
 Tom Dent (cricketer) (Thomas Henry Dent, 1879–1929), Australian cricketer and banker
 Thomas de Dent (died 1361), English born cleric and judge who held high office in Ireland

See also 
 Dent (surname)